In robotics and motion planning, a velocity obstacle, commonly abbreviated VO, is the set of all velocities of a robot that will result in a collision with another robot at some moment in time, assuming that the other robot maintains its current velocity.  If the robot chooses a velocity inside the velocity obstacle then the two robots will eventually collide, if it chooses a velocity outside the velocity obstacle, such a collision is guaranteed not to occur.

This algorithm for robot collision avoidance has been repeatedly rediscovered and published under different names:
in 1989 as a maneuvering board approach, 
in 1993 it was first introduced as the "velocity obstacle",
in 1998 as collision cones, 
and in 2009 as forbidden velocity maps.
The same algorithm has been used in maritime port navigation since at least 1903.

The velocity obstacle for a robot  induced by a robot  may be formally written as

where  has position  and radius , and  has position , radius , and velocity .  The notation  represents a disc with center  and radius .

Variations include common velocity obstacles (CVO), finite-time-interval velocity obstacles (FVO), generalized velocity obstacles (GVO), hybrid reciprocal velocity obstacles (HRVO), nonlinear velocity obstacles (NLVO),  reciprocal velocity obstacles (RVO), and recursive probabilistic velocity obstacles (PVO).

References 

Geometric algorithms
Multi-robot systems
Robot kinematics